Giacomo Nani or simply Nani was the name of at least two ships of the Italian Navy named in honour of the Venetian admiral Giacomo Nani and may refer to:

 , a  launched in 1918 and discarded in 1935.
 , a  launched in 1938 and sunk in 1941.

Italian Navy ship names